Alberto Castrenze Costa (born 13 November 1971) is a British Conservative Party politician. He has been the Member of Parliament (MP) for South Leicestershire since the 2015 general election.

Early life
Costa was born to Italian parents who have lived in Scotland for 50 years. He grew up in Bishopbriggs. He trained as a solicitor and worked at the Treasury Solicitor's Department.

Political career
At the 2010 general election, Costa unsuccessfully contested the Angus constituency; where he finished in second place behind the sitting MP Mike Weir of the Scottish National Party.

Costa was opposed to Brexit prior to the 2016 EU referendum.

He currently leads the House of Commons delegation of MPs affiliated to the Conservative Friends of Greece parliamentary group, he is also co-Chairman of the All Party Parliamentary Group for Italy, co-Chairman of the All Party Parliamentary Group for Medical Cannabis under Prescription and Chairman of the All Party Parliamentary Group for Microplastics.

Since 2018, he has campaigned against the release of the convicted child-killer Colin Pitchfork, who murdered two girls in the South Leicestershire constituency in the 1980s. Pitchfork was released from prison on 1 September 2021 before being recalled to prison weeks later for breaching his licence conditions. On 13 July 2022, Costa asked the Prime Minister Boris Johnson for the Government's help in intervening in Pitchfork's next parole hearing which is scheduled to take place in September 2022.

On 27 February 2019, he was asked to resign, and did so, from his role as parliamentary private secretary in the Scotland Office following his tabling of an amendment to protect rights of EU citizens. Shortly before his resignation, Home Secretary Sajid Javid backed the amendment in a committee meeting and said that the Government would support it. It was later passed unopposed, approved 'on the nod' by the Commons.

In 2019, Costa sent a survey to 11,000 residents in villages close to the site of the proposed Hinckley National Rail Freight Interchange. In February 2020, he held a Westminster Hall debate in Parliament to discuss the plans and local concerns in more detail, in June 2022 he held a further debate in Parliament on the proposals.

He has also been campaigned for safety improvements to be made to the A5 road in South Leicestershire, specifically the High Cross and Smockington Hollow junctions which are known locally as accident blackspots, in January 2020 he welcomed £3 million improvements put forward by National Highways to improve safety.

In January 2021, he asked the then Vaccination Minister Nadhim Zahawi to reopen the Feilding Palmer Hospital in Lutterworth as a vaccination hub during the COVID-19 pandemic, the hospital was then reopened as a vaccination hub in February 2021. In June 2021, Costa asked the then Health Secretary Sajid Javid for his help in keeping the Feilding Palmer Hospital in Lutterworth open.

In November 2021, he called on the government to allow more prescriptions of medical cannabis to children with rare forms of epilepsy, citing the case of two of his young constituents.

Linked to his work as Chairman of the All Party Parliamentary Group for Microplastics, Costa introduced a Ten Minute Rule Bill in Parliament on 30 November 2021, the 'Microplastic Filters (Washing Machine) Bill' required washing machine manufacturers to fit microplastic catching filters in new washing machines to help stop microplastic pollution.

References

External links

1971 births
British solicitors
Conservative Party (UK) MPs for English constituencies
British politicians of Italian descent
Living people
UK MPs 2015–2017
UK MPs 2017–2019
UK MPs 2019–present
People from Bishopbriggs
Scottish people of Italian descent
Alumni of the University of Glasgow